2-hydroxyethylphosphonate:O2 1,2-oxidoreductase may refer to:

 2-hydroxyethylphosphonate dioxygenase, an enzyme
 Methylphosphonate synthase, an enzyme